The Chikman is a river in Perm Krai, Russia, a left tributary of the Yayva. It starts on the west slope of North Ural, north of Mount Sheludyak. Its mouth is upstream of the village Sukhaya,  from the mouth of the Yayva. There are some small tributaries; the most significant are:
 Left: Poludennaya (33 km), Syuz (23 km), Talitsa (18 km);
 Right: Sukhaya

References

Rivers of Perm Krai